Tawera is a given name. Notable people with the name include:

 Tawera Nikau (born 1967), New Zealand rugby league footballer
 Tawera Kerr-Barlow (born 1990), Australian-born New Zealand rugby union footballer

See also
 Tawera, a genus of marine bivalves
 Ngāti Te Tāwera